L'Œil d'or, le prix du documentaire — Cannes ("The Golden Eye, The Documentary Prize — Cannes") is a documentary film award created in 2015. It is awarded to the best documentary presented in one of the sections of the Cannes Film Festival (Official Selection, Directors' Fortnight, International Critics' Week and Cannes Classics). Initiated by the Civil Society of Multimedia Authors (SCAM - Société Civile des Auteurs Multimédia) and its President Julie Bertuccelli, the prize is awarded in partnership with the Institut national de l'audiovisuel and with the support of Cannes Film Festival and its General Delegate Thierry Frémaux. Since 2017, the Audiens Cultural Personal Joint Group has also been a partner.

The prize, which consists of €5,000, is presented to the director of the winning film at an official ceremony in Cannes. It was presented for the first time on 23 May 2015 at the Palais des Festivals.

Winners

Special mentions
In addition to the winners of L'Œil d'or, some films have received a special mention.

References

External links
 Official Website of the SCAM
 Cannes Film Festival's Official Website

Lists of films by award
Cannes Film Festival
Awards established in 2015
Documentary film awards
2015 establishments in France